The Alpensia Resort is a ski resort and a tourist attraction. It is located on the territory of the township of Daegwallyeong-myeon, in the county of Pyeongchang.

Overview
The ski resort is approximately 2.5 hours from Seoul or Incheon Airport by car, predominantly all motorway. From Seoul Cheongrangri KTX station  (NE Seoul) as well as Seoul KTX station 1 and half hour KTX Jinbu station newly-opened from Feb. 22, 2017 exclusively-built for PyeongChang 2018.
There are purple ski shuttle buses to the resort 3 or 4 times a day.

While the resort is open year-round, the off-season turns the bottom of the slopes into a wild flower garden estimating 100,000-square meters. 

When the ski and snowboarding season opens, all runs are serviced by chairlifts and are named: Alpha (beginner), Bravo (beginner/intermediate), Charlie, Delta, Echo and Foxtrot catering for intermediate ability. All slopes are closed between 4:30 pm and 6:30 pm each day for piste-maintenance. Night skiing is available from 6:30 pm to 10 pm. 

Alpensia is a 5–10-minute car ride to the more extensive Yongpyong Ski Resort which has a full range of runs.

In the resort village are three main accommodation providers - Intercontinental Hotel, Holiday Inn Hotel, and Holiday Inn Suites.

The Alpensia Ski Jumping Stadium is located within the station and was the location of the ski jumping events of the 2018 Winter Olympics.

Alpensia was the focus of the 2018 Cultural Olympiad, with a new, purpose-built concert hall within the resort as well as an indoor water park.

History
The decision to build Alpensia resort was taken in 2003, in the frame of the ambition of the Gangwon Province to host the Winter Olympics. The resort was built on vacated farmlands and potato fields. The facility was completed in 2011.

In 2013, Alpensia Resort was one of the venues of the 2013 Special Olympics World Winter Games.

In 2021, the resort's convention center, Alpensia Convention Center, was used as a filming location for Loud, where remaining contestants went there for the second round.

2018 Winter Olympics
The Alpensia Resort has been the focus of the outdoor sports of the 2018 Pyeongchang Winter Olympics.

The venues are the following:
 Alpensia Ski Jumping Stadium – Ski jumping, Nordic combined
 Alpensia Biathlon Centre – Biathlon
 Alpensia Nordic Centre – Cross-country skiing, Nordic combined
 Alpensia Sliding Centre – Luge, bobsleigh and skeleton

In addition, Alpensia is the location of an Olympic Village and the nearby Yongpyong Ski Resort will be the venue for alpine skiing technical events (slalom and giant slalom). The speed events of downhill, super-G, and combined will be held at Jeongseon Alpine Centre, currently under development.

After the Olympics, Alpensia Resort also hosted the 2018 Winter Paralympics.

Financial problems
In 2012, it was announced that Alpensia Resort was threatened by bankruptcy, having accumulated losses of $55 million annually. Although this has been denied by Kim Jin-sun from the POCOG in January 2013, the financial problems had not improved as of September 2013. Some Gangwon Congress members insisted on selling Alpensia before it was too late. Others argued either to request financial support from the government or to withdraw from the acceptance of the 2018 Pyeongchang Winter Olympics.

References

External links

 

Ski areas and resorts in South Korea
Venues of the 2018 Winter Olympics
Tourist attractions in Pyeongchang County
Sports venues in Pyeongchang County